The following is a list of the IRMA's number-one singles of 1991.

18 number ones
Most number ones: Zig and Zag, The Simpsons, U2 (2)
Most weeks at number one (artist): The Simpsons (13 weeks)
Most weeks at number one (single): "Everything I Do (I Do it for You)" - Bryan Adams (11 weeks)

See also
1991 in music
List of artists who reached number one in Ireland

1991 in Irish music
1991 record charts
1991